John Joseph Fitzgerald (March 10, 1872 – May 13, 1952) was an American lawyer and politician who served nine terms as a United States Representative from New York from 1899 to 1917.

Life and politics
Born in Brooklyn, he attended the public schools, La Salle Military Academy (formerly Sacred Heart Academy), and graduated from Manhattan College in 1891. He studied law in the New York Law School, was admitted to the bar in 1893 and commenced practice in New York City.

Political career 
From 1900 to 1928 he was a delegate to each Democratic National Convention. Fitzgerald was also a trustee of Manhattan College.

Tenure in Congress 
Fitzgerald was elected as a Democrat to the Fifty-Sixth and to the nine succeeding Congresses and held office from March 4, 1899, to December 31, 1917, when he resigned to resume the practice of law.

In the Sixty-Second through Sixty-Fifth Congresses he was chairman of the Committee on Appropriations.

Later career and death 
In March 1932 he was appointed county judge of Kings County; he was elected in November 1932 and served until his retirement on December 31, 1942. He resumed the private practice of law and in 1952 died in Brooklyn; interment was in St. John's Cemetery, Middle Village, Queens.

References

1872 births
1952 deaths
Politicians from Brooklyn
Manhattan College alumni
New York Law School alumni
New York (state) state court judges
Burials at St. John's Cemetery (Queens)
Democratic Party members of the United States House of Representatives from New York (state)